The Águeda is a river tributary of the Douro River, that springs from the Serra das Mesas in Spain, in the autonomous community of Castile and León. It flows  until it reaches the Douro River near Barca de Alva, Portugal. The Portugal–Spain border follows the Águeda for much of its course.

See also 
 List of rivers of Spain

References

Sources

 

Rivers of Spain
Rivers of Portugal
Rivers of Castile and León
International rivers of Europe
Portugal–Spain border
Border rivers
Tributaries of the Douro River